Olipporu is a 2013 Indian Malayalam-language film, directed by A. V. Sasidharan and produced by Sheikh Afsal. The film stars Kalabhavan Mani, Zarina Wahab, Fahad Fazil and Subhiksha in lead roles. The film had musical score by John P Varkey.

Cast
Kalabhavan Mani as Kumaran
Zarina Wahab 
Fahad Fazil as Ajayan
Subiksha as Vani
Sidharth Bharathan 
Thalaivasal Vijay 
Aju Varghese
 Ali Kaipuram as protestor

Soundtrack
The music was composed by John P. Varkey.

References

External links
  
 

2013 films
2010s Malayalam-language films
Films scored by John P. Varkey
Films shot in Thrissur